X-ray fluorescence holography (XFH) is a holography method with atomic resolution based on atomic fluorescence. It is a relatively new technique that benefits greatly from the coherent high-power X-rays available from synchrotron sources, such as the Japanese SPring-8 facility.

Imaging
Fluorescent X-rays are scattered by atoms in a sample and provide the object wave, which is referenced to non-scattered X-rays. A holographic pattern is recorded by scanning a detector around the sample, which allows researchers to investigate the local 3D structure around a specific element in a sample.

Applications
It is useful for investigating the effects of irradiation on high temperature superconductors.

Twin picture
One of the criticisms for this method is that it suffers from twin images. D. Gabor. Barton proposed that reconstructed phased images of holograms will suppress twin images effects.

References

X-ray spectroscopy
Holography